The 1982 South Dakota gubernatorial elections were held on November 2, 1982, to elect a Governor of South Dakota. Republican candidate Bill Janklow was elected, defeating Democratic nominee Mike O'Connor to take a second term in office.

Republican primary

Candidates
Bill Janklow, incumbent Governor of South Dakota

Democratic primary

Candidates
 Mike O'Connor, member of the South Dakota State Senate
 Elvern Varilek

Results

General election

Results

References

1982
South Dakota
1982 South Dakota elections